Sorbus pseudothuringiaca is a species of flowering plant in the family Rosaceae. It is a small tree endemic to Bavaria in Germany, where it is found growing on rocky or forested areas.

References

Flora of Germany
pseudothuringiaca
Vulnerable plants
Endemic flora of Germany
Taxonomy articles created by Polbot